This is a list of American films released in 2016.

Box office
The highest-grossing American films released in 2016, by domestic box office gross revenue, are as follows:

January–March

April–June

July–September

October–December

See also
 2016 in American television
 2016 in the United States
 List of 2016 box office number-one films in the United States

References

External links

 

2016
Lists of 2016 films by country or language
Films